Jonathan Vidallé Calvo is an Argentine former footballer who played as a forward. Besides Argentima, he has played in Switzerland and Italy.

Career
A product of Vélez Sarsfield, Vidallé moved to Chilean side Provincial Osorno in 1997. After a stint with Swiss side St. Gallen, he played for several clubs in Italy in both Serie B and Serie C.

Following his retirement, he has developed a career as a scouting manager for clubs such as Arsenal in England, Parma in Italy and Boca Juniors in Argentina.

Personal life
He is the son of the former Argentine international goalkeeper Enrique Vidallé.

References

External links
 
 

1977 births
Living people
Argentine footballers
Argentine expatriate footballers
Argentine Primera División players
Club Atlético Vélez Sarsfield footballers
Chilean Primera División players
Provincial Osorno footballers
Swiss Super League players
FC St. Gallen players
Serie B players
Serie C players
U.S. Cremonese players
L'Aquila Calcio 1927 players
Rimini F.C. 1912 players
U.S. Avellino 1912 players
Taranto F.C. 1927 players
A.S. Sambenedettese players
U.S. Viterbese 1908 players
S.S.D. Città di Gela players
S.S. Virtus Lanciano 1924 players
Argentine expatriate sportspeople in Chile
Argentine expatriate sportspeople in Switzerland
Argentine expatriate sportspeople in Italy
Expatriate footballers in Chile
Expatriate footballers in Switzerland
Expatriate footballers in Italy
Association football forwards
Argentine football managers
Arsenal F.C. non-playing staff
Argentine expatriate sportspeople in England
Place of birth missing (living people)